Enchodeloides is a monotypic genus of nematodes belonging to the family Nordiidae. The only species is Enchodeloides signyensis.

The species is found in near Antarctica.

References

Nematodes